Przemysław Stolc (born 3 July 1994) is a Polish professional footballer who plays as a defender for Arka Gdynia.

Honours

Club
Arka Gdynia
 Polish Cup: 2016–17

References

External links
 
 

Polish footballers
1994 births
Living people
Arka Gdynia players
Chrobry Głogów players
Ekstraklasa players
I liga players
II liga players
Sportspeople from Gdynia
Association football defenders